Senator Larsen may refer to:

Allan Larsen (1919–2005), Idaho State Senate
Cliff Larsen (fl. 2000s–2010s), Montana State Senate
Oley Larsen (born 1964), North Dakota State Senate
Richard F. Larsen (born 1936), North Dakota State Senate
Sylvia Larsen (born 1949), New Hampshire State Senate

See also
Senator Larson (disambiguation)